"The Love for Three Oranges" or "The Three Citrons" is an Italian literary fairy tale written by Giambattista Basile in the Pentamerone.  It is the concluding tale, and the one the heroine of the frame story uses to reveal that an imposter has taken her place.

Summary
A king, who only had one son, anxiously waited for him to marry. One day, the prince cut his finger; his blood fell on white cheese. The prince declared that he would only marry a woman as white as the cheese and as red as the blood, so he set out to find her.

The prince wandered the lands until he came to the Island of Ogresses, where two little old women each told him that he could find what he sought here, if he went on, and the third gave him three citrons, with a warning not to cut them until he came to a fountain.  A fairy would fly out of each, and he had to give her water at once.

He returned home, and by the fountain, he was not quick enough for the first two, but was for the third.  The woman was red and white, and the prince wanted to fetch her home properly, with suitable clothing and servants. He had her hide in a tree. A black slave, coming to fetch water, saw her reflection in the water, and thought it was her own and that she was too pretty to fetch water.  She refused, and her mistress beat her until she fled.  The fairy laughed at her in the garden, and the slave noticed her.  She asked her story and on hearing it, offered to arrange her hair for the prince.  When the fairy agreed, she stuck a pin into her head, and the fairy only escaped by turning into a bird.  When the prince returned, the slave claimed that wicked magic had transformed her.

The prince and his parents prepared for the wedding.  The bird flew to the kitchen and asked after the cooking.  The lady ordered it be cooked, and it was caught and cooked, but the cook threw the water it had been scalded in, into the garden, where a citron tree grew in three days.  The prince saw the citrons, took them to his room, and dealt with them as the last three, getting back his bride.  She told him what had happened.  He brought her to a feast and demanded of everyone what should be done to anyone who would harm her.  Various people said various things; the slave said she should be burned, and so the prince had the slave burned.

Analysis

Tale type
It is Aarne-Thompson type 408, and the oldest known variant of this tale. Scholarship point that the Italian version is the original appearance of the tale, with later variants appearing in French, such as the one by Le Chevalier de Mailly (Incarnat, blanc et noir (fr)). In de Mailly's version, the fruits the girls are trapped in are apples.

While analysing the imagery of the golden apples in Balkanic fairy tales, researcher Milena Benovska-Sabkova took notice that the fairy maiden springs out of golden apples in these variants, fruits that are interpreted as having generative properties.

According to Walter Anderson's unpublished manuscript, variants with eggs instead of fruits appear in Southeastern Europe.

The transformations and the false bride
The tale type is characterized by the substitution of the fairy wife for a false bride. The usual occurrence is when the false bride (a witch or a slave) sticks a magical pin into the maiden's head or hair and she becomes a dove. In some tales, the fruit maiden regains her human form and must bribe the false bride for three nights with her beloved. 

In other variants, the maiden goes through a series of transformations after her liberation from the fruit and regains a physical body. In that regard, according to Christine Shojaei-Kawan's article, Christine Goldberg divided the tale type into two forms. In the first subtype, indexed as AaTh 408A, the fruit maiden suffers the cycle of metamorphosis (fish-tree-human) - a motif Goldberg locates "from the Middle East to Italy and France". In the second subtype, AaTh 408B, the girl is transformed into a dove by the needle.

Separated from her husband, she goes to the palace (alone or with other maidens) to tell tales to the king. She shares her story with the audience and is recognized by him.

Parallels
The series of transformations attested in these variants (from animal to tree to tree splinter or back into the fruit whence she came originally) has been compared to a similar motif in the Ancient Egyptian story of The Tale of Two Brothers.

This cycle of transformations also appears in Iranian tales, specially "The Girl of Naranj and Toranj". Based on the Iranian tales, Iranian scholarship suggests that these traits seem to recall an Iranian deity of vegetation.

Other motifs
In an article discussing the Maltese variants of the tale type, Maltese linguist George Mifsud Chircop drew attention to the water motif and its symbolism: the parents of the prince build a fountain for the people; when the maiden is released from the fruit she asks for food and water; the false bride mistakes the fruit maiden's visage for her own reflection in the water; the maiden is thrown in the water (well) and becomes a fish. Folklorist Christine Goldberg also noted that water motif present in the tale type: the fountain built at the beginning of the story; the release of the fruit maiden near a body of water, and the prince leaving the maiden on a tree near a water source (well or stream). She also remarked that the fountain motif is "echoed" by the well.

Variants

Origins
Scholar Jack Zipes suggests that the story "may have originated" in Italy, with later diffusion to the rest of Southern Europe and into the Orient.

Richard McGillivray Dawkins, on the notes on his book on Modern Greek Folktales in Asia Minor, suggested a Levantine origin for the tale, since even Portuguese variants retain an Eastern flavor.

According to his unpublished manuscript on the tale type, Walter Anderson concluded that the tale originated in Persia. The tale type then migrated through two different routes: one to the East, to India, and another to the West, to the Middle East and to the Mediterranean.

Scholar Linda Dégh suggested a common origin for tale types ATU 403 ("The Black and the White Bride"), ATU 408 ("The Three Oranges"), ATU 425 ("The Search for the Lost Husband"), ATU 706 ("The Maiden Without Hands") and ATU 707 ("The Three Golden Sons"), since "their variants cross each other constantly and because their blendings are more common than their keeping to their separate type outlines" and even influence each other.

Scholar Christine Goldberg, in her monograph, concluded that the tale type emerged as an amalgamation of motifs from other types, integrated into a cohesive whole. In another article, she suggested an East to West direction for the diffusion of the tale.

Distribution
19th century Portuguese folklorist Consiglieri Pedroso stated that the tale was "familiar to the South of Europe". In the same vein, German philologist Bernhard Schmidt located variants in Wallachia, Hungary, Italy and Sicily.

In the 20th century, folklorist Stith Thompson suggested the tale had a regular occurrence in the Mediterranean Area, distributed along Italy, Greece, Spain and Portugal. French folklorist Paul Delarue, in turn, asserted that the highest number of variants are to be found in Turkey, Greece, Italy and Spain.

Italian scholars complement their analyses: while recognizing that it is a "very popular tale", the tale type appears "almost exclusively" in Southern and Southeastern Europe. Milena Benovska-Sabkova and Walter Puchner state its wide diffusion in the Balkans.

Further scholarly research points that variants exist in Austrian, Ukrainian and Japanese traditions. In fact, according to Spanish scholar Carme Oriol, the tale type is "well known" in Asia, even in China and Korea.

The tale type is also found in Africa and in America.

Europe

Italy
The "Istituto centrale per i beni sonori ed audiovisivi" ("Central Institute of Sound and Audiovisual Heritage") promoted research and registration throughout the Italian territory between the years 1968–1969 and 1972. In fact, this country holds the highest number of variants, according to scholarship.

Italo Calvino included a variant The Love of the Three Pomegranates, an Abruzzese version known too as As White as Milk, As Red as Blood but noted that he could have selected from forty different Italian versions, with a wide array of fruit. For instance, the version The Three Lemons, published in The Golden Rod Fairy Book and Vom reichen Grafensohne ("The Rich Count's Son"), where the fruits are Pomeranzen (bitter oranges).

In a Sicilian variant, collected by Laura Gonzenbach, Die Schöne mit den sieben Schleiern ("The Beauty with Seven Veils"), a prince is cursed by an ogress to search high and low for "the beauty with seven veils", and not rest until he finds her. The prince meets three hermits, who point him to a garden protected by lions and a giant, In this garden, there lies three coffers, each one holding a veiled maiden inside. The prince releases the maiden, but leaves her by a tree and returns to his castle. He kisses his mother and forgets his bride. One year later, he remembers the veiled maiden and goes back to her. When he sights her, he finds "an ugly woman". The maiden was transformed into a dove. Laura Gonzenbach also commented that the tale differs from the usual variants, wherein the maiden appears out of a fruit, like an orange, a citron or an apple.

Spain
North American folklorist Ralph Steele Boggs (de) stated that the tale type was very popular in Spain, being found in Andalusia, Asturias, Extremadura, New and Old Castile.

According to Spanish folklorist Julio Camarena (es), the tale type, also known as La negra y la paloma ("The Black Woman and the Dove"), was one of the "more common" (más usuales) types found in the Province of Ciudad Real.

Northern Europe
Despite a singular attestation of the tale in a Norwegian compilation of fairy tales, its source was a foreign woman who became naturalized.

Slovakia 
Variants also exist in Slovakian compilations, with the fruits being changed for reeds, apples or eggs. Scholarship points that the versions where the maidens come out of eggs are due to Ukrainian influence, and these tales have been collected around the border. The country is also considered by scholarship to be the "northern extension" of the tale type in Europe.

A Slovak variant was collected from Jano Urda Králik, a 78-year-old man from Málinca (Novohrad) and published by linguist Samuel Czambel (sk). In this tale, titled Zlatá dievka z vajca ("The Golden Woman from the Egg"), in "Britain", a prince named Senpeter wants to marry a woman so exceptional she cannot be found "in the sun, in the moon, in the wind or under the sky". He meets an old woman who directs him to her sister. The old woman's sister points him to a willow tree, under which a hen with three eggs that must be caught at 12 o'clock if one wants to find a wife. After, they must go to an inn and order a hearty meal for the egg maiden, otherwise she will die. The prince opens the first two eggs in front of the banquet, but the maiden notices some dishes missing and perishes. With the third egg maiden, she survives. After the meal, the prince rests under a tree while the golden maiden from the egg walks about. She asks the innkeeper's old maid about a well, where the old maid shoves her into and she becomes a goldfish. The prince wakes up and thinks the old maid as his bride. However, the prince's companion notices it is not her, but refrains from telling the truth. They marry and a son is born to the couple. Some time later, the old king wishes for a drink of that well, and sends the prince's companion to fetch it. The companion grabs a bucket of water with the goldfish inside. He brings the goldfish to the palace, but the old maid throws the fish into the fire. A fish scale survives and lodges between the boards of the companion's hut. He cleans up the hut and throws the trash in a pile of manure. A golden pear tree sprouts, which the false princess recognizes as the true egg princess. She orders the tree to be burnt down, but a shard remains and a cross is made out of it. An old lady who was praying in church finds the cross and takes it home. The cross begins to talk and the old lady gives it some food, and the golden maiden from the egg regains human form. They begin to live together and the golden maiden finds work at a factory. The prince visits the factory and asks her story, which she does not divulge. He returns the next day to talk to her and, through her tale, pieces the truth together. At last, he executes the false bride and marries the golden maiden from the egg.

Slovenia 
In a Slovenian variant named The Three Citrons, first collected by author Karel Jaromír Erben, the prince is helped by a character named Jezibaba (an alternative spelling of Baba Yaga). At the end of the tale, the prince restores his fairy bride and orders the execution of both the false bride and the old grandmother who told the king about the three citrons. Walter William Strickland interpreted the tale under a mythological lens and suggested it as part of a larger solar myth. Parker Fillmore published a very similar version and sourced his as "Czechoslovak".

Croatia 
In a Croatian variant from Varaždin, Devojka postala iz pomaranče ("The Maiden out of the Pomerances"), the prince already knows of the magical fruits that open and release a princess.

A Croatian storyteller from near Daruvar provided a variant of the tale type, collected in the 1970s.

Ukraine 
Professor Nikolai P. Andrejev noted that the tale type 408, "Любовь к трем апельсинам" or "The Love for Three Oranges", showed 7 variants in Ukraine.

In a Ukrainian Carpathian variant titled A gazdag földesúr fia, the son of a rich nobleman wants to discover the world and leaves home. He finds work with an old woman and is paid with three eggs after three years' time. The youth opens each egg, each containing a maiden inside, the last of which he gives water to. The silver-haired egg maiden is replaced by a gypsy woman and goes through a cycle of transformations: goldfish, tree (sprouted from the fish scales), bedposts and a dove (when the bedposts are burnt). She regains her human form, is adopted by an old woman at the edge of the village. One day, she conceals her silver hair and goes to the castle with other women to work and sing, and reveals her tale.

Poland 
In a Polish variant from Dobrzyń Land, Królówna z jajka ("The Princess [born] out of an egg"), a king sends his son on a quest to marry a princess born out of an egg. He finds a witch who sells him a pack of 15 eggs and tells him that if any egg cries out for a drink, the prince should give them immediately. He returns home. On the way, every egg screams for water, but he fails to fulfill their request. Near his castle, he drops the last egg on water and a maiden comes out of it. He goes back to the castle to find some clothes for her. Meanwhile, the witch appears and transforms the maiden into a wild duck. The prince returns and notices the "maiden"'s appearance. They soon marry. Some time later, the gardener sees a golden-feathered duck in the lake, which the prince wants for himself. While the prince is away, the false queen orders the cook to roast the duck and to get rid of its blood somewhere in the garden. An apple tree with seven blood red apples sprouts on its place. The prince returns and asks for the duck, but is informed of its fate. When strolling in the garden, he notices a sweet smell coming from the apple tree. He orders a fence to be built around the tree. After he goes on a trip again, the false queen orders the apples to be eaten and the tree to be felled down and burned. A few wood chips remain in the yard. An old woman grabs hold of them to make a fire, but one of the woodchips keeps jumping out of the fire. She decides to bring it home with her. When the old lady goes out to buy bread, the egg princess comes out of the woodchip to clean the house and returns to that form before the old lady comes home at night. This happens for two days. On the third day, the old lady discovers the egg maiden and thanks her. They live together, the egg maiden now permanently in human form, and the prince, feeling sad, decides to invite the old ladies do regale him with tales. The egg maiden asks for the old lady for some clothes so she can take part in the gathering. Once there, she begins to tell her tale, which the false queen listens to. Frightened, she orders the egg maiden to be seized, but the prince recognizes her as his true bride and executes the false queen.

Polish ethnographer Stanisław Ciszewski (pl) collected another Polish variant, from Smardzowice, with the name O pannie, wylęgniętej z jajka ("About the girl hatched from an egg"). In this story, a king wants his son to marry a woman who is hatched from an egg. Seeking such a lady, the prince meets an old man who gives him an egg and tells him to drop it in a pool in the forest and wait for a maiden to come out of it. He does as he is told, but becomes impatient and breaks open the egg still in the water. The maiden inside dies. He goes back to the old man, who gives him another egg and tells him to wait patiently. This time a maiden is born out of the egg. The prince covers her with his cloak takes her on his horse back to his kingdom. He leaves the egg girl near a plantation and goes back to the palace to get her some clothes. A nearby reaper maid sees the egg girl and drowns her, replacing her as the prince's bride. The egg maiden becomes a goldfish which the false queen recognizes and orders to be caught to make a meal out of it. The scales are thrown out and an apple tree sprouts on the spot. The false bride orders the tree to be cut down. Before the woodcutter fulfills the order, the apple tree agrees to be cut down, but requests that someone take her woodchips home. They are taken by the bailiff. Whenever she goes out and returns home, the entire house is spotless, like magic. The mystery of the situation draws the attention of the people and the prince, who visits the old lady's house. He sees a woman going to fetch water and stops her. She becomes a snake to slither away, but the man still holds on to her. She becomes human again and the man recognizes her as the egg maiden. He takes her home and the false bride drops dead when she sees her.

Hungary

Greece 
Scholars Anna Angelopoulou and Aigle Broskou, editors of the Greek Folktale Catalogue, stated that tale type 408 is "common" in Greece, with 85 variants recorded. According to Walter Puchner, Greek variants of the tale type amount to 99 tales, some with contamination with type 403A.

Austrian consul Johann Georg von Hahn collected a variant from Asia Minor titled Die Zederzitrone. The usual story happens, but, when the false bride pushed the fruit maiden into the water, she turned into a fish. The false bride then insisted she must eat the fish; when the fish was gutted, three drops of blood fell to the floor and from them sprouted a cypress. The false bride then realized the cypress was the true bride and asked the prince to chop down the tree and burn it, making some tea with its ashes. When the pyre was burning, a splinter of the cypress got lodged in an old lady's apron. When the old lady left home for a few hours, the maiden appeared from the splinter and swept the house during the old woman's absence. Von Hahn remarked that this transformation sequence was very similar to one in a Wallachian variant of The Boys with the Golden Stars.

Romania 
Writer and folklorist Cristea Sandu Timoc noted that Romanian variants of the tale type were found in Southern Romania, where the type was also known as Fata din Dafin ("The Bay-Tree Maiden").

In a Romanian variant collected by Arthur and Albert Schott from the Banat region, Die Ungeborene, Niegesehene ("The Not-Born, Never Seen [Woman]"), a farmer couple prays to God for a son. He is born. Whenever he cries, his mother rocks his sleep by saying he will marry "a woman that was not born nor any man has ever seen". When he comes of age, he decides to seek her. He meets Mother Midweek (Wednesday), Mother Friday and Mother Sunday. They each give him a golden apple and tell him to go near a water source and wait until a maiden appears; she will ask for a drink of water and after he must give her the apple. He fails the first two times, but meets a third maiden; he asks her to wait on top of a tree until he returns with some clothes. Some time later, a "gypsy girl" comes and sees the girl. She puts a magic pin on her hair and turns her into a dove.

In another Romanian variant, Cele trei rodii aurite ("The Three Golden Pomegranates"), the prince is cursed by a witch to never marry until he finds the three golden pomegranates.

Bulgaria 
The tale type is also present in Bulgaria, with the name "Неродената мома" or "Неродена мома" or Das ungeborene Mädchen ("The Maiden That Was Never Born"), with 21 variants registered. According to the Bulgarian Folktale Catalogue by Liliana Daskalova-Perkovska, the girls may appear out of apples, watermelons or cucumbers, and become either a fish or a bird.

Cyprus 
At least one variant from Cyprus, from the "Folklore Archive of the Cyprus Research Centre", shows a merger between tale type ATU 408 with ATU 310, "The Maiden in the Tower" (Rapunzel).

Malta 
Maltese linguist George Mifsud Chircop stated that the story ‘is-seba’ trongiet mewwija’ is popular in Malta and Gozo.

In a variant from Malta, Die sieben krummen Zitronen ("The Seven Crooked Lemons"), a prince is cursed by a witch to find the "seven crooked lemons". On an old man's advice, he grooms an old hermit, who directs him to another witch's garden. There, he finds the seven lemons, who each release a princess. Every princess asks for food, drink and garments before they disappear, but the prince helps only the last one. He asks her to wait atop a tree, but a Turkish woman comes and turns her into a dove.

A second Maltese variant was collected by researcher Bertha Ilg-Kössler (es), titled Die sieben verdrehten Sachen ("The Seven Crooked Things"). In this version, a king promises to build a fountain of some liquid for the poor if he is blessed with a son. His prayers are answered. The prince grows up and scares an old woman who has come to the fountain. The old woman curses him to burn with love and never rest until he finds "The Seven Crooked Things". The prince travels high and low until he meets a Turkish bakerwoman who gives the prince seven fruits that look like dry nuts.

Azerbaijan
In an Azeri tale, "Девушка из граната" ("The Girl from the Pomegranate"), a prince dreams of a maiden in a pomegranate. He decides to seek her out. He visits three dev mothers, who indicate the way to the garden. He takes the three pomegranates and leaves the garden. The first two fruits yield nothing, but the third releases the maiden. He asks the girl to wait nearby a tree, while he goes back to the kingdom. A slave girl sees the maiden, shoves her down the well and replaces her. The girl becomes a rosebush, a platane tree and a tree splinter. The splinter is found by a man and brought to his home. The fruit maiden comes out of the splinter to do household chores and is discovered by the man. One day, the prince summons all women to his yard for them to tell him stories, and the fruit maiden sings about her story while weaving and counting pearls.

Yiddish
In a Yiddish folktale from Russia, The Princess of the Third Pumpkin, an old woman tells the royal couple and the prince to seek a garden with three pumpkins. The prince goes to this garden, gets the gourds and opens each one; a maiden coming out of each one. Only the third is given water. The prince makes her wait while he goes back to the castle. A "gypsy woman" appears, shoves the pumpkin girl into a well and replaces her as the prince's beloved. Meanwhile, the girl becomes a fish in the well, is killed, and its scales are used into a pair of shoes. The old woman sees that the girl comes out of the fish scales to clean her house.

Georgia
In a Georgian variant translated into Hungarian with the title Az uborkalány ("The Cucumber Girl"), an old woman curses a prince to not rest until he finds the cucumber girl. He travels to another kingdom and steals a cucumber from a royal garden. When he cuts open the vegetable, a girl appears. He takes her to the border of his kingdom and goes to the castle, but the girl from the cucumber warns him against it. An Arab girl appears, trades clothes with her and throws the maiden in the well. The cucumber girl goes through a cycle of transformations (goldfish, then a silver tree, then tree splinter, and human again). She appears out of the tree splinter to clean an old woman's house, and goes to the castle with other woman to tell stories to the prince. The cucumber girl tells her tale and the prince notices the deception.

Asia 
The tale is said to be "very popular in the Orient". Scholar Ulrich Marzolph remarked that the tale type AT 408 was one of "the most frequently encountered tales in Arab oral tradition", albeit missing from The Arabian Nights compilation.

Middle East
Scholar Hasan El-Shamy lists 21 variants of the tale type across Middle Eastern and North African sources, grouped under the banner The Three Oranges (or Sweet-Lemons).

A version from Palestina (a jrefiyye, or 'magic tale') was collected with the title Las muchachas de las toronjas ("The Girls from the Toranjs").

Iran
German scholar , in his catalogue of Persian folktales, listed 23 variants of the tale type across Persian sources. In these tales, the fruit maidens appear out of apples, pomegranates, bitter oranges, or some other type of fruit from a tree guarded by evil creatures (in some tales, the divs). The fruit maidens also go through a death and rebirth cycle.

Author Katherine Pyle published the tale The Three Silver Citrons and sourced it as a Persian tale. In this story, a dying king begs his three sons to look for wives. The two elders ride on a road and see a passing beggar. The man begs for food other than black bread, but the two princes refuse to give him. They find normal wives for themselves. The third prince meets the same beggar man and gives him some food. In return, he is gifted with a magical pipe that summon little black "trolls" as helpers. The prince asks the trolls where he can find the loveliest princess in the world, and the small creatures take him there. They reach a castle the prince enters alone; in a chamber, he meets three maidens that, frightened by his presence, become three silver citrons. The prince takes all three fruits and leaves the castle.

Another Persian variant, The Orange and Citron Princess, was collected by Emily Lorimer and David Lockhart Robertson Lorimer, from Kermani. In this tale, the hero receives the blessing of a mullah, who mentions the titular princess as "The Daughter of the Orange and the Golden Citron". The hero's mother advises against her son's quest for the maiden, because it would lead to his death. The tale is different in that there is only one princess, instead of the usual three.

In an Iranian tale collected by orientalist Arthur Christensen with the title Goldapfelsins Tochter ("The Golden Orange Daughter"), a king promises to build a fountain of honey and butter that the poor can collect if his son's health improves. It so happens. One day, a poor old woman comes to the fountain to get some butter and honey, but the prince frightens the woman by playing a prank on her: he shoots an arrow at an egg she is carrying. The old woman curses the prince to fall in love and to seek the Golden Orange Daughter. The prince's curiosity is piqued and he asks the old woman where he can find her. The old woman answers that in the country of peris and devs, an orange tree holds fruits with a young woman inside. The prince takes seven oranges from a garden guarded by Divs. he cuts open the first six fruits; a maiden appears out of it, asking for bread and water, but, since the prince is on the road and far from any city, she dies. The seventh maiden is given bread and water, but appears in black garments - she explains to the prince she is mourning for the other maidens, her sisters. A black maidservant kills the orange maiden and takes her place, while she becomes a lovely little bush, from which she exits to act as the mysterious housekeeper for an old washerwoman. Later, the orange maiden, named Nänä Gâzor, and other women are invited to the castle to tell stories and work.

Another "very famous" Iranian tale is Dokhtar-e Naranj va Toranj ("The Daughter of the Orange and the Bergamot"), which largely follows the tale sequence, as described in the international index: a childless king promises to build a fountain for the poor. The prince is born and humiliates an old woman, who curses him to burn with love for a fruit maiden. This fabled girl can only be found in a garden in a distant land. The prince gets the fruits, opens it near the water and a beautiful girl comes out of it. He leaves the girl near a tree, until an ugly slave comes, kills the fruit maiden and replaces her. The ugly slaves passes herself off as the fruit maiden and marries the prince. However, her rival is still alive: she becomes an orange tree, which the slave wants chopped down and made into furniture.

Professor Mahomed-Nuri Osmanovich Osmanov (ru) published an Iranian tale with the title "Померанцевая Дева" ("The Pomerance Girl"). In this tale, the childless padishah promises to build a fountain of honey and butter for the poor. God hears his prayers and a son is born. Twenty years later, when an old woman goes to the fountain to fetch some butter and honey, the prince says it is empty. Disappointed, the old woman tells the prince to look for the titular Pomerance Girl. The girl is the daughter of the Padishah of the Peris, and lives as a fruit in a distant garden, guarded by divs. The prince takes three pomerances and opens each one; out comes a maiden asking for water and bread. Only the third survives because he gives her food and drink.

Russian Iranist Alexander Romaskevich (ru) collected another Iranian tale in the Jewish-Iranian dialect of Shiraz with the title "Жена-померанец и злая негритянка" ("The Orange-Wife and the Evil Black Woman").

Iraq
Author Inea Bushnaq published an Iraqi variant titled The Maiden of the Tree of Raranj and Taranj. In this tale, a childless king prays to Allah to have a son. The queen does the same: if her prayers are answered, she shall have fat and honey flow through the kingdom. Their prayers are answered, but the queen forgets to fulfill her promise, until the young prince has a dream in which a person tells the boy to remind his mother of her promise. The fountains are built. One day, an old woman fetches some fat and honey in her bowl. From his window, the prince shoots an arrow at the woman's bowl, which breaks apart. The old woman curses the prince to search for the "Maiden of the Tree of Raranj and Taranj", who, the prince learns, is hidden in a tree in a garden watched over by djinns.

Turkey
In the Typen türkischer Volksmärchen ("Turkish Folktale Catalogue"), by Wolfram Eberhard and Pertev Naili Boratav, tale type ATU 408 corresponds to Turkish type TTV 89, "Der drei Zitronen-Mädchen" ("The Three Citron Maidens"). Alternatively, it may also be known as Üç Turunçlar ("Three Citruses" or "Three Sour Oranges"). The Turkish Catalogue registered 40 variants, being the third "most frequent folktale" after types AT 707 and AT 883A.

In Turkish variants, the fairy maiden is equated to the peri and, in several variants, manages to escape from the false bride in another form, such as a rose or a cypress. In most of the recorded variants, the fruits are oranges, followed by pomegranates, citrons, and cucumbers in a few of them, finally apples, eggs or pumpkins, respectively in one variant each.

Hungarian folklorist Ignác Kúnos published a Turkish variant with the title A három narancs-peri, translated into English as The Three Orange-Peris. The tale was also translated as The Orange Fairy in The Fir-Tree Fairy Book.

Afghanistan
In an Afghan tale from Herat, The Fairy Virgin in a Pumpkin, a prince goes to a garden to pick up exquisite pumpkins and brings them home. He cuts open one of them and out comes a fairy maiden, who complains to him. He walks a bit more and rests by a canal. He decides to cut open the second pumpkin and out comes a second fairy maiden. She says she is naked and asks him to bring her some clothes. Since she is naked and anyone might see her, she climbs up a tree. While the prince is away, the fairy maiden protects the Simurgh's nest from a snake attack. Soon after, an ugly maidservant appears and sees a beautiful face reflected in the water - the fairy's. Thinking it is her own, she goes back to her master and says she will not work for him anymore. Her master beats and expels her. The maidservant sees the fairy maiden on the tree. Suddenly, the tree splits open, the fairy maiden enters it, and it closes again. The maidservant replaces her and marries the prince. One day, she asks for the tree to be used to make a cradle for her daughter. Sensing it is the fairy maiden, somehow still alive, she orders the cradle to be burnt to cinders. An old woman gathers some leftover wood and cotton and takes them home. The fairy maiden comes out of the wood and the cotton to help the old woman spin and do the chores. One day, the prince summons all maidens to his yard to string a pearl necklace for his daughter. The fairy maiden is invited and the prince recognizes her.

India
Stith Thompson's second revision of the international type index listed 17 variants of the tale type in India.

In a variant from Simla, in India, The Anar Pari, or Pomegranate Fairy, the princess released from the fruit suffers successive deaths ordered by the false bride, yet goes through a resurrective metamorphosis and regains her original body.

Richard McGillivray Dawkins remarked that the Indian tales The Bél-Princess, collected by Maive Stokes, and The Belbati Princess, by Cecil Henry Bompas, are "near relatives" of The Three Citrons, since the two Indian tales are about a beautiful princess hidden in a fruit and replaced by a false bride. In The Bél-Princess, the youngest son of a king looks for the titular princess. While working for a fakir, he is told of her location: the Bél-Princess is inside a bel-fruit in a tree in garden guarded by demons. In The Belbati Princess, the youngest of seven brothers, named Lita, seeing his siblings already married, wishes to have for wife no one but the Belbati Princess. Lita meets three holy muni on his journey, who direct him to a garden with rakshasas that guard the bel tree with the fruit that holds the princess.

In a variant from Mirzapur, collected from teller Karam-ud-din Ahmad with the title Princess Pomegranate (Anar Shahzadi), a king has four sons, three already married and the youngest still single. His sisters-in-law mock him by saying he intends to marry Anar Shahzadi (Princess Pomegranate). Piqued by curiosity, he learns this princess lives in a pomegranate in a garden guarded by lakhs of deos (demons). He rescues the fruit and brings it to his kingdom. A lovely princess comes out of the pomegranate, until a mehtaráni (sweeper) tricks her and throws her in the water. The Pomegranate Princess becomes a lotus flower then a pomegranate tree with blooms.

Charles Augustus Kincaid published a tale from Gujarat with the name Rupsinh and the Queen of the Anardes. In this tale, prince Rupsinh loses his parents and his elder brother when he is only a child. His widowed sister-in-law mentions the Queen of the Anardes, which sparks an idea in the young prince: he will journey far and wide to find this Queen. After a long journey, including a stop at the kingdom of Princess Phulpancha, he reaches the kingdom of the Anardes. He learns the Queen and her handmaidens come out of the pomegranates in a garden, dance and return to the fruits. He takes the pomegranate with the queen and brings it to his kingdom. They marry, but a sweeper named Rukhi, "skilled in black magic", disposes of her and takes her place. The Queen of the Anardes becomes a lotus flower, then a mango tree, and reincarnates as the daughter of a banai couple.

At least one variant of the tale type has been collected in Kashmir.

Japan
Japanese scholarship argues for some relationship between tale type ATU 408 and Japanese folktale Urikohime ("The Melon Princess"), since both tales involve a maiden born of a fruit and her replacement for a false bride (in the tale type) and for evil creature Amanojaku (in Japanese versions). In fact, professor Hiroko Ikeda classified the story of Urikohime as type 408B in his Japanese catalogue.

Tibet
In a Tibetan tale, Drolmakyid the Fairy, after an old woman curses him to search for the titular Fairy Drolmakyid, the prince finds an orange and brings it with him. He peels the orange and a beautiful maiden appears. They hire a servant girl (a witch in disguise), who shoves Drolmakyid down in a lake and replaces her as the prince's wife. The fairy goes through a cycle of transformations: golden lotus flower, then to walnut tree, then human again by leaving a single walnut and working as a mysterious housekeeper for a poor family.

Shan people
In a tale collected from the Shan people, The Story of a Fairy and a Prince, a king has seven sons, the six eldest already married and the seventh and youngest still single. The youngest prince tells his father he will only marry a fairy, and the king sets a deadline for him: he must find a wife in seven days, on penalty of death. The prince journeys and meets three hermits, who direct him to garden guarded by an ogre where a bale-fruit tree is located. The prince releases the fairy from the fruit and places her on top of a tree, while he returns with a retinue. While he is away, a servant woman named Mai-pom-san-ta kills the fairy and replaces her. The fairy becomes a flower that is taken by an old woman to her house.

Americas

Brazil
In a Brazilian variant collected by lawyer and literary critic Silvio Romero, A moura torta, a father gives each of his three sons a watermelon and warns them to crack open the fruits near a body of water. The elder sons open their watermelons, a maiden appears out of each and asks for water or milk, then, unable to sate her thirst, dies. The third brother opens his near a spring and gives water to the maiden. Seeing that she is naked, he directs her to climb a tree while he returns with some clothes. A nearby moura (Moorish woman) sees the maiden's reflection in the water, notices the maiden on the tree and turns her into a dove by sticking a pin on her head.

Popular culture

Theatre and opera
The tale was the basis for Carlo Gozzi's commedia dell'arte L'amore delle tre melarance, and for Sergei Prokofiev's opera, The Love for Three Oranges.

Hillary DePiano's play The Love of the Three Oranges is based on Gozzi's scenario and offers a more accurate translation of the original Italian title, L'amore delle tre melarance, than the English version which incorrectly uses for Three Oranges in the title.

Literature
A literary treatment of the story, titled The Three Lemons and with an Eastern flair, was written by Lillian M. Gask and published in 1912, in a folktale compilation.

The tale was also adapted into the story Las tres naranjitas de oro ("The Three Little Golden Oranges"), by Spanish writer Romualdo Nogués.

Bulgarian author Ran Bosilek adapted a variant of the tale type as his book "Неродена мома" (1926).

Television
A Hungarian variant of the tale was adapted into an episode of the Hungarian television series Magyar népmesék ("Hungarian Folk Tales") (hu), with the title A háromágú tölgyfa tündére ("The Fairy from the Oak Tree"). This version also shows the fairy's transformation into a goldfish and later into a magical apple tree.

See also

Lovely Ilonka
Nix Nought Nothing
The Bee and the Orange Tree
The Enchanted Canary
The Lassie and Her Godmother
The Myrtle
The King of the Snakes
Sandrembi and Chaisra

Footnotes

References

Bibliography
 Bolte, Johannes; Polívka, Jiri. Anmerkungen zu den Kinder- u. hausmärchen der brüder Grimm. Zweiter Band (NR. 61-120). Germany, Leipzig: Dieterich'sche Verlagsbuchhandlung. 1913. p. 125 (footnote nr. 2).
 Oriol, Carme (2015). "Walter Anderson’s Letters to Joan Amades: A Study of the Collaboration between Two Contemporary Folklorists". Folklore: Electronic Journal of Folklore 62 (2015): 139–174. 10.7592/FEJF2015.62.oriol.
 Shojaei-Kawan, Christine (2004). "Reflections on International Narrative Research on the Example of the Tale of the Three Oranges (AT 408)". In: Folklore (Electronic Journal of Folklore), XXVII, pp. 29–48.

Further reading
 Cardigos, Isabel. "Review [Reviewed Work: The Tale of the Three Oranges by Christine Goldberg]" Marvels & Tales 13, no. 1 (1999): 108–11. Accessed June 20, 2020. www.jstor.org/stable/41388536.
 Da Silva, Francisco Vaz. "Red as Blood, White as Snow, Black as Crow: Chromatic Symbolism of Womanhood in Fairy Tales." Marvels & Tales 21, no. 2 (2007): 240–52. Accessed June 20, 2020. www.jstor.org/stable/41388837.
 Gobrecht, Barbara. "Auf den Spuren der Zitronenfee: eine Märchenreise. Der Erzähltyp 'Die drei Orangen’ (ATU 408)“. In: Märchenspiegel. 17. Jahrgang. November 2006. pp. 14-30.
 Hemming, Jessica. "Red, White, and Black in Symbolic Thought: The Tricolour Folk Motif, Colour Naming, and Trichromatic Vision." Folklore 123, no. 3 (2012): 310–29. Accessed June 20, 2020. www.jstor.org/stable/41721562.
 剣持 弘子 [Kendo, Hiroko].「瓜子姫」 —話型分析及び「三つのオレンジ」との関係— ("Urikohime": Analysis and Relation with "Three Oranges"). In: 『口承文芸研究』nr. 11 (March, 1988). pp. 45-57.
 Mazzoni, Cristina. "The Fruit of Love in Giambattista Basile's “The Three Citrons”." Marvels & Tales 29, no. 2 (2015): 228-44. Accessed June 20, 2020. doi:10.13110/marvelstales.29.2.0228.
 Prince, Martha. "The love for three oranges (Aarne-Thompson Tale Type 408): A study in traditional variation and literary adaptation." Electronic Thesis or Dissertation. Ohio State University, 1962. https://etd.ohiolink.edu/

External links
 The Three Citrons, on Laboulaye's Fairy Book

Italian fairy tales
Fiction about shapeshifting
Stories within Italian Folktales
Recurrent elements in fairy tales

ATU 400-459
ATU 700-749
False hero

de:Die drei Zitronen
fr:Les Trois Cédrats